{{DISPLAYTITLE:C15H18N2}}
The molecular formula C15H18N2 may refer to:

 N-Isopropyl-N'-phenyl-1,4-phenylenediamine
 Pirlindole
 WAY-629

Molecular formulas